"Bullseye" is the fourth episode of the second series of the 1960s cult British spy-fi television series The Avengers, starring Patrick Macnee and Honor Blackman. It was first broadcast by ABC on 20 October 1962. The episode was directed by Peter Hammond and written by Eric Paice.

Plot
Steed and Cathy investigate illegal gunrunning to Africa by a British arms manufacturer.

Cast
 Patrick Macnee as John Steed
 Honor Blackman as Cathy Gale
 Ronald Radd as Henry Cade
 Charles Carson as Brigadier Williamson
 Judy Parfitt as Miss Doreen Ellis
 Felix Deebank as Young
 Mitzi Rogers as Jean
 Robin Wentworth as George the Foreman
 Fred Ferris as Inspector
 Bernard Kay as Karl
 Laurie Leigh as Dorothy Young
 John Frawley as Reynolds
 Graeme Bruce as Shareholder

References

External links

Episode overview on The Avengers Forever! website

The Avengers (season 2) episodes
1962 British television episodes